Roger Paulin is an emeritus professor of German at the University of Cambridge. He was the Schröder Professor of German from 1989 to 2005.

In 2002 he was awarded a Humboldt Prize.

References

External links

Year of birth missing (living people)
Living people
English literary critics
Fellows of Trinity College, Cambridge
Alumni of the University of Cambridge